Mom and the Red Bean Cake is a 2010 South Korean documentary about a single mother with stomach cancer who supports her family by selling cakes, directed by Yoo Hae-jin. It was produced by MBC, and honored at the 38th International Emmy Awards.

References 

2010 television films
2010 films
South Korean television films
South Korean documentary films
2010 documentary films
2010s Korean-language films
2010s South Korean films